1530 Rantaseppä, provisional designation , is a stony Florian asteroid from the inner regions of the asteroid belt, approximately 5 kilometers in diameter. Discovered by Yrjö Väisälä at Turku Observatory in 1938, it was later named after Finnish astronomer Hilkka Rantaseppä-Helenius.

Discovery 

Rantaseppä was discovered on 16 September 1938, by Finnish astronomer Yrjö Väisälä at Turku Observatory in Southwest Finland. Two night later, the body was independently discovered by Belgian astronomer Eugène Delporte at Uccle Observatory. The body's observation arc begins at Uccle, one day after its official discovery observation at Turku.

Classification and orbit 

Rantaseppä is a member of the Flora family of stony asteroids, one of the largest families of the main belt. It orbits the Sun in the inner main-belt at a distance of 1.8–2.7 AU once every 3 years and 4 months (1,231 days). Its orbit has an eccentricity of 0.20 and an inclination of 4° with respect to the ecliptic.

Physical characteristics

Lightcurve 

In December 2016, a rotational lightcurve of Rantaseppä was obtained from photometric observations by Czech astronomer Petr Pravec at the Ondřejov Observatory and its photometric program of near-Earth objects. Lightcurve analysis gave a rotation period of 3.5258 hours with a relatively high brightness variation of 0.41 magnitude, which is indicative of a non-spheroidal shape.

Diameter and albedo 

According to the survey carried out by NASA's Wide-field Infrared Survey Explorer with its subsequent NEOWISE mission, Rantaseppä measures 5.044 and 5.195 kilometers in diameter and its surface has an albedo of 0.3791 and 0.400, respectively. The Collaborative Asteroid Lightcurve Link assumes an albedo for a stony S-type asteroid of 0.24 – derived from 8 Flora, the family's largest member and namesake – and calculates a diameter of 5.93 kilometers with an absolute magnitude of 13.3.

Naming 

This minor planet was named in memory of Finnish astronomer Hilkka Rantaseppä-Helenius (1925–1975), an observer of comets and asteroids at the Turku Astronomical-Optical Institute of the University of Turku. The official  was published by the Minor Planet Center on 20 February 1976.

Notes

References

External links 
 Asteroid Lightcurve Database (LCDB), query form (info )
 Dictionary of Minor Planet Names, Google books
 Asteroids and comets rotation curves, CdR – Observatoire de Genève, Raoul Behrend
 Discovery Circumstances: Numbered Minor Planets (1)-(5000) – Minor Planet Center
 
 

001530
Discoveries by Yrjö Väisälä
Named minor planets
19380916